The 1986–87 Major Indoor Soccer League season was the ninth in league history and ended with the Dallas Sidekicks winning their first MISL title over the Tacoma Stars.

Recap
It was a topsy-turvy season. Attempts to stabilize the league's presence in New York by moving the league office and putting the league's newest franchise there were unsuccessful. The New York Express barely made it to the All-Star break. A stock sale had been a massive failure and results were equally bad on the field. With the club's record at 3-23, management announced on February 16 that they would be unable to finish the season.

As for matters on the field, league officials made plans to expand the schedule further despite losing the Pittsburgh Spirit the previous spring. Not only would each team play 52 games, the playoffs would be expanded to include two best-of seven rounds. With all but one of the six preceding series going to a deciding game, Game 7 of the championship series would be played on June 20, the latest date in MISL history and six days after the conclusion of the NBA Finals. Games 3 and 6 at Dallas' Reunion Arena were sellouts, and the Tacoma Dome attracted crowds of 20,284 and 21,728 for Games 5 and 7, the two largest crowds in MISL playoff history.

The San Diego Sockers' dominance ended this season, as long-term injuries to last year's playoff MVP Brian Quinn and other Sockers had the team uncharacteristically struggling. They would finish eight games behind the Stars, who were led by Steve Zungul and owned the MISL's best regular-season record. Despite Quinn's return for the playoffs, Tacoma defeated San Diego in Game 7 of their division final matchup. It was the first indoor playoff series loss ever for the Sockers, ending a run of 15 straight series wins dating back to the 1981–82 NASL Indoor season.

In the end, the Sidekicks epitomized the MISL season. The club folded in June 1986, yet a last-ditch effort by fans brought the club back to life within three weeks. Tatu led the league in goals and points, and earned both the regular-season and playoff MVP awards. Dallas rallied from a 2-1 series deficit to beat the Baltimore Blast in the first round, and won Games 6 and 7 of the championship series in overtime. Mark Karpun scored both overtime goals, and his Game 6 double overtime winner ended the longest game in MISL playoff history.

Six days after the Sidekicks' victory, the MISL granted a conditional franchise to NBA Denver Nuggets owner Sidney Shlenker for the 1988-89 season. When the planned "Denver Desperados" franchise had only 400 season tickets instead of the required 5,000 four months after the announcement, the franchise was revoked on November 5.

Teams

Regular season schedule

The 1986–87 regular season schedule ran from November 13, 1986, to May 3, 1987. 
The schedule was lengthened to 52 games per team, the longest to date in MISL history.

Final standings

Playoff teams in bold.

Playoffs

Division Semifinals

Division Finals

Championship Series

Regular Season Player Statistics

Scoring leaders
GP = Games Played, G = Goals, A = Assists, Pts = Points

Leading Goalkeepers
Note: GP = Games played; Min – Minutes played; GA = Goals against; GAA = Goals against average; W = Wins; L = Losses

Playoff Player Statistics

Scoring leaders
GP = Games Played, G = Goals, A = Assists, Pts = Points

Leading Goalkeepers
Note: GP = Games played; Min – Minutes played; GA = Goals against; GAA = Goals against average; W = Wins; L = Losses

All-MISL Teams

League awards
 Most Valuable Player: Tatu, Dallas
 Scoring Champion: Tatu, Dallas
 Pass Master: Kai Haaskivi, Cleveland
 Defender of the Year: Bruce Savage, Baltimore
 Rookie of the Year: John Stollmeyer, Cleveland
 Newcomer of the Year: Steve Kinsey, Minnesota
 Goalkeeper of the Year: Tino Lettieri, Minnesota
 Coach of the Year: Dave Clements, Kansas City
 Championship Series Most Valuable Player: Tatu, Dallas

Team attendance totals

References

External links
 The Year in American Soccer – 1987
 1987 page - Dallas Sidekicks Memorial Archive
 1986-87 summary at The MISL: A Look Back

1986-87
1
1